Florianópolis is the capital and second largest city of the state of Santa Catarina, in the South region of Brazil. The city encompasses Santa Catarina Island and surrounding small islands, as well as part of the mainland. It has a population of 508,826, according to the 2020 IBGE (Brazilian Institute of Geography and Statistics) population estimate, the second-most populous city in the state (after Joinville), and the 47th in Brazil. The metropolitan area has an estimated population of 1,111,702, the 21st largest in the country. The city is known for having the country's third highest Human Development Index score among all Brazilian cities (0.847).

The economy of Florianópolis is heavily based on information technology, tourism, and services. The city has 60 beaches and is a center of surfing activity. Lagoa da Conceição is the most famous area for tourism, recreation, nature, and extreme sports. The New York Times reported that "Florianopolis is the Party Destination of the Year in 2009." Newsweek placed Florianópolis in its "ten most dynamic cities of the world" list in 2006. Veja, a Brazilian publication, named the city as "the best place to live in Brazil." As a result of this exposure, Florianópolis is growing as a second home destination for many Paulistas, Argentines, Uruguayans, U.S. citizens, and Europeans.

Florianópolis is also commonly known by the nicknames Floripa and Ilha da Magia (Magic Island). Most of the population lives on the mainland and on the island's central and northern parts. The southern half is less inhabited. Many small commercial fishermen populate the island. The fishing boats, the lacemakers, the folklore, the cuisine and the colonial architecture contribute to the growing tourism and attracts resources that compensate for the lack of any large industry. Villages immersed in tradition and history, such as Santo Antônio de Lisboa and Ribeirão da Ilha still resist the advances of modernity.

The Hercílio Luz International Airport serves the city. Florianópolis is home to the Universidade Federal de Santa Catarina (Federal University of Santa Catarina). There are also the Santa Catarina Federal Institute of Education, Science and Technology (Instituto Federal de Santa Catarina), and two campuses of the Universidade do Estado de Santa Catarina (State University of Santa Catarina), among other institutions of higher and professional education.

Etymology 
The name Florianópolis was meant to be a tribute to Marshal Floriano Peixoto, the second President (1891–1894) of the Republic of the United States of Brazil and from Greek term polis, meaning "city". Until 1893, the city was called Nossa Senhora do Desterro (Our Lady of Banishment) or simply Desterro.

Geography

Vegetation
Florianópolis has a native Atlantic Forest-type vegetation. This vegetation has an extremely diverse and unique mix of vegetation and forest types. The main ecoregion is the coastal Atlantic forest, the narrow strip of about  along the coast which covers about 20 percent of the region. Altitude determines at least three vegetation types in the Atlantic Forest: the lowland forest of the coastal plain, montane forests, and the high-altitude grassland or "campo rupestre."

It also contains part of the  Serra do Tabuleiro State Park, a mountainous area covered in lush forests.
The park protects the sources of the Vargem do Braço, Cubatão and Una rivers, which supply most of the drinking water for greater Florianópolis and the south coast region.
The municipality contains the  Rio Vermelho State Park in the northeast of Santa Catarina Island, created in 2007.

Precipitation
There is significant precipitation which is well distributed throughout the year. There is no dry season, and summer generally is the rainiest season. The driest months are from June to August.

Climate
Florianópolis experiences a warm humid subtropical climate (Koppen: Cfa), falling just short of a true tropical climate. The seasons of the year are distinct, with a well-defined summer and winter, and characteristic weather for autumn and spring. Due to the proximity of the sea, the relative humidity of the atmosphere is 80% on average.

History

Carijós Indians, a Tupi people, were the first inhabitants of the Florianópolis area. The traces of its presence are verified through archaeological sites and sambaquis dating up to 4000 years ago. The Indians called the place Meiembipe or "mountain along the channel".

Around 1514 the Portuguese landed and gave the area the name Ilha dos Patos, but in 1526 it was renamed Ilha de Santa Catarina (Saint Catherine's Island). The area supplied the vessels that went to the River Plate (Río de la Plata) Basin.

The official settlement of the island began in 1673 with the arrival of bandeirante Francisco Dias Velho's agricultural company and it continued in 1678 with the construction of a chapel consecrated to Nossa Senhora do Desterro. At this time a villa began to take form, slowly becoming a colonial settlement.

To guarantee its domain the Portuguese Crown elevated Santa Catarina Island to the category of village in 1714 with the name of Nossa Senhora do Desterro and already in 1726 they promoted it again, now to the category of town.

From this date on Vila do Desterro and mainly the port began to have a strategic function because it was situated halfway between Rio de Janeiro and Buenos Aires, possibly two of the largest seaside cities of South America at that time. For this reason in 1739 the Capitania da Ilha de Santa Catarina was created and Desterro became its capital. Soon the most expressive seaside defensive ring of Southern Brazil started to be built: Santa Cruz, São José da Ponta Grossa, Santo Antonio and Nossa Senhora da Conceição da Barra do Sul fortresses.

With the coming of the Captaincy the population began to grow, but the great population growth happened between 1747 and 1756 with the arrival of about 6,000 settlers coming from the Archipelago of Azores and from Madeira Island. The development of the agriculture, the cotton and linen industry and the commerce followed the Azorean occupation.
In 1823, during the monarchy which ended in 1889, Desterro became the Capital of Santa Catarina Province opening a period of prosperity with many urban works and also intense political organization.

Regional elites not happy with the government centralization staged the Federalist Revolt at the beginning of the Brazilian Republic. The movement that started in Rio Grande do Sul spread to Santa Catarina and turned Desterro into the Federalist Capital of the Republic. The then president of Brazil, marshal Floriano Peixoto, known as the Iron Marshal, suppressed the rebellion and ordered the shooting of many people who were considered enemies of the state, in the Anhatomirim Island Fortress. Possibly to show loyalty to the marshal, 1893 saw the change of the state capital's name: from Desterro to Florianópolis, that is to say, city of Floriano.

Demographics

According to the IBGE of 2007, there were 406,564 people residing in the city (in 2010 IBGE reports a population of 421,240). The last PNAD (National Research for Sample of Domiciles) census revealed the following numbers: 356,142 White people (84.55%), 41,009 Pardo (Multiracial) people (9.74%), 20,839 Black people (4.95%), 2,196 Asian people (0.52%) and 1,028 Amerindian people (0.24%).
Florianópolis has a population mostly composed of Brazilians of European descent. The numbers of immigrants started to increase in the mid-18th century, mostly with the arrival of Portuguese colonists from the Azores Islands. The population of Florianópolis was composed mainly of Portuguese/Azoreans, Germans, and Italians. Further south, some neighborhoods preserve their rural village identity. The cultural heritage left by their Azorean ancestors is noticeable in their dialect, in handicrafts, and traditional festivities.

The small village of Santo António de Lisboa (Saint Anthony of Lisbon) is an example of colonial period architecture and in Ribeirão da Ilha, the oldest part of the capital, the inhabitants speak in an accent closer to the Azorean dialect of the first settlers. In Ribeirão da Ilha is the church of Our Lady of Lapa do Ribeirão, built in 1806. Lagoa da Conceição, with its many sand dunes, restaurants and seaside night life and where women make lace to sell in the street, has also managed to retain many traces of its colonial architecture.

The city is densely populated, with a population distribution of 623.68 inhab./km2, the 6th highest in the state of Santa Catarina. The vast majority of Florianopólis residents live in the urban area of the municipality, corresponding to 96.2% of its inhabitants, while 3.78% live in the rural area of Florianópolis.

On the other side, the city has taken on a cosmopolitan air with the arrival of Brazilians from other states and foreigners who chose to live there. The island, which at the beginning of the colonization period, was an important whale hunting centre, is today a technological pole of the IT industry. A State Capital of interest to tourism, Florianópolis population in 2020 was estimated to be around 508,826 people in the city proper and 1,111,702 people in the metropolitan area.

Religion

According to the 2010 Brazilian Census, most of the population (63.68%) is Roman Catholic, other religious groups include Protestants and evangelicals (12.81%), Spiritists (7.48%), Umbandists (0.66%), No religion (11.76%), and people with other religions (3.39%).

Economy

According to 2002 Sefaz statistics, agricultural activities represented 0.05%, manufacturing represented 3.41% and the commerce and service sector 96.54%.

Tourism is one of the staples of Florianópolis' economy, and relates to not only Floripa's Azorean culture but also the fact that it is situated on the coastline. Its environmental restrictions on building and commercial development have been more or less strictly enforced, helping it to keep its original character.

The city has invested heavily in infrastructure, from roads to schools, and Florianópolis ranks high on development measures such as literacy (97 percent) and electrification (near 100 percent). By the late 1990s, private companies were flocking to the island, or emerging from a technology "incubator" at the federal university. (Among the innovations it hatched: the computerized voting machines that have reduced fraud and increased efficiency in Brazilian elections.) Local officials now say their aim is to be the Silicon Valley of Brazil, with beaches.

In addition to its white sand beaches, Florianópolis offers many historical attractions, including the sites of the original Azorean colonists, the Lagoa da Conceição lagoon, and Santo Antônio de Lisboa. Tourism in Florianópolis has grown significantly over the past 10 years, with increasing numbers of visitors coming from other large cities in Brazil (particularly Porto Alegre, Curitiba, São Paulo and Rio de Janeiro) as well as other South American countries (particularly Argentina, with direct flights offered daily from Buenos Aires).

During the past decade technology and software development firms also experienced strong growth, and today Information Technology services are one of the top revenue generators in Florianópolis. Several technology centers are spread around Florianópolis, making the city an important pole in this economic sector.

The GDP for the city was R$323,264,000,000 (2019).

The per capita income for the city was R$43,843 (2019).

Education

Educational institutions
 Universidade Federal de Santa Catarina (UFSC);
 Universidade do Estado de Santa Catarina (UDESC);
 Serviço Nacional de Aprendizagem Comercial (Senac/SC)
 Complexo de Ensino Superior de Santa Catarina (CESUSC);
 Universidade do Sul de Santa Catarina (UNISUL);
 Universidade do Vale do Itajaí (UNIVALI);
 Centro Universitário Estácio de Sá de Santa Catarina;
 Instituto Federal de Educação, Ciência e Tecnologia de Santa Catarina (IFSC);
 and many others.

Primary and secondary schools
The Florianópolis high schools that obtained the best results on the 2007 Exame Nacional do Ensino Médio (National High School Exam) are Escola Autonomia, Colégio da Lagoa, Colégio Energia, Colégio Tendência, Colégio Expoente, Colégio Adventista de Florianópolis, Colégio Geração, Colégio de Aplicação UFSC, EEB Feliciano Nunes Pires, IFSC, Colégio Decisão, EEB Professor AníbalNunes Pires, Instituto Estadual de Educação, EEB Osmar Cunha, EEb Getúlio Vargas, EEB Presidente Roosevelt, EEB Professor Henrique Stodieck.

Tourism and lifestyle

Florianópolis is one of the most visited places in Brazil as it is an island with 42 beaches, lagoons and waterfalls.

Beaches
Lagoa da Conceição (Lagoon of Conceição) is the largest lagoon on the island of Florianopolis and one of the most visited area of the island by foreign travelers and backpackers. The area has the highest concentration of restaurants, bars, organic markets and shops. Many expats and Brazilian people from other cities choose to live by the lagoon because of its views, safety, nature and quality of life.

The lagoon is surrounded by mountains and has a canal linking to the ocean. The history of the region around the lagoon is a plus with all the folklore, netting tradition, old Portuguese architecture, graffiti, and an 18th-century church on the top of the hill. See panoramic view below.

The Holy Spirit Feast (Festa do Divino) is a festival that takes place 40 days after Easter. The celebration dates to the colonial era and includes a parade, music, and street food.

Mole Beach (Praia Mole)
is one of the best known beaches close to the Lagoon of Conceição and is noted for its rolling green hills and rock formations on either side. The beach is mostly known for surfing, eco-friendly lounges and LGBTQ scene during the summer. The beach is one of the locations for the ASP World Tour of the Association of Surfing Professionals, which classifies 50 competitors, among professionals and amateurs. The state of Santa Caterina is the only location in South America for this surfing event. Santa Catarina Art Museum is located in the city.

Joaquina Beach (Praia da Joaquina)
Became well known in the 1970s, when surfers from around the world discovered its waves. Joaquina Beach is accessible from the Lagoon of Conceição. Many surf cups began to emerge, and great Catarinense surfing personalities. It is one of the beaches that offers the best tourist facilities, receiving a large number of tourists from around Brazil and the world on the warm days in spring and summer. The rock complex situated to the left of the beach, the night lighting and the public showers are some of the trademarks at Joaquina. There is a big paid parking lot, toilets, tourist coach parking lot, lifeguards, police station, handicraft shop, bars, restaurant and hotels. Sand boards can be rented on the spot.

Barra da Lagoa
Barra da Lagoa is a quaint fisherman's village. The physical characteristics of the beach makes it an ideal place to learn to surf. It is in a natural setting as there are no huge hotels on the beach and the Southern headquarters of Projeto TAMAR (Save the Turtles) is located here. Penguins swim into the canal and near the beach of Barra da Lagoa during the colder winter months of June, July and August. The canal at Barra da Lagoa connects the Lagoa da Conceição with the open sea. It is not uncommon to see fishermen during the night tossing their nets in the lagoa to catch shrimp they sell to the fresh fish restaurants in this community.

Ingleses Beach (Praia dos Ingleses)
Even though it is a beach preferred by tourists, Ingleses still keeps to the traditions of the Azorian colonizers. In the summer, it is one of the top beach destinations of Argentine tourists, second only to Canasveiras. In the winter, mullet fishing, religious celebrations and regional festivities are demonstrations of the local culture. The dunes separating the Ingleses Beach (English Beach) from the Santinho Beach are the main natural attractions. The practice of sandboarding is quite common there, with vendors renting sand boards by the dunes.

Armação Beach (Praia da Armação)
The Sant'Anna Church, built by the Armação fishing company, is part of the beach's history. It was from there that whale harpooners and crewmen confessed and attended the mass before going fishing. Next, the priest would go down to the beach to bless the boats that would sail out to sea. Today, the boats leave there for Ilha do Campeche, one of the most visited islands around Florianópolis. It is also in Armação that one finds one of the most important archaeological sites of the State of Santa Catarina. In the winter of 2010 a significant portion of the beach disappeared due to erosion. With financial aid from the Brazilian federal government, tons of large rocks were dumped on the beach to prevent houses from destruction.

Campeche Beach (Praia do Campeche)
With  of white sands and a turbulent waters, Campeche is considered the Jeffreys Bay of the Santa Catarina Island for the quality of its waves. For those who are not interested in surfing, the beach offers other attractions. At night, Campeche is also an attraction. The huge reflector illuminates part of the large sand strip in front of the bars. The illumination favours the fishermen with the production in this area.

Santinho Beach (Praia do Santinho)  is mainly sought by tourists who look for nature, and the location's tranquility. Surfers are the main visitors and consider Santinho to be the best beach in the North of the Santa Catarina Island. It is in the left hand corner, where bathers do not venture, that surfers practice their sport, sharing the space with fishermen.  away from the centre of Florianópolis, another attraction of this beach are the primitive inscriptions made by hunters, fishermen and collectors inhabiting the Island five thousand years ago. The name Santinho (little saint) comes from a human figure engraved (a petroglyph) on an isolated block of rock, the Costão do Santinho.

Other attractions
Outdoor sports, including diving, hang gliding, rowing, paragliding, and mountain biking, as well as surfing, are common on the island.

The island is connected to the Continent by three bridges. The Hercílio Luz Bridge that was built in 1926, this bridge is 11 years older than Golden Gate Bridge, but is now closed to traffic; it is a symbol of the island and often appears on postcard images. The Colombo Sales Bridge and Pedro Ivo Bridge are the ones open to traffic.

Santo Amaro da Imperatriz was the first thermal water facility in Brazil. Hotels with thermal bath facilities are located in the district of Caldas da Imperatriz and in the city of Águas Mornas. It is located on the Estrada Geral Highway, km 4, Caldas da Imperatriz district.

Areas of the city

The centre of Florianópolis, with its alleys, rows of typical houses, churches and museums, includes many examples of colonial architecture. Among these are the Palacio Cruz e Sousa, formerly the Governor's residence, now restored to house the Santa Catarina Museum, renamed in honour of João da Cruz e Sousa, homegrown poet, journalist and founder of Brazil's Symbolist movement; the Mercado Público de Florianópolis (Public Market since 1898), a colourful nexus of food vendors and local handicrafts in the shade of hundred-year-old fig trees. Close to the centre is the house where Victor Meirelles was born, one of the authors who devised the first Catholic mass spoken in Brazil. The building is registered by the Institute of Historical and Artistic Heritage and houses the Victor Meirelles Museum.

Roughly speaking, the island can be divided in a northern and a southern region: the north is most visited by tourists and consequently, it bustles with the best services and visitor infrastructure. In some quarters notice a strong influence in the population architecture and customs. Lifelong residents of Florianópolis, especially the older generation, retain the heritage left by immigrants from Portuguese islands from Azores, in the way they speak, in their artistry and craftwork and in a busy calendar of festivals. The south of the island is less busy but nonetheless preserves the intensely Azorean customs that arrived in Santa Catalina throughout the 18th century.

It preserves a significant area of mangroves on the Ilha de Santa Catarina.
The Pirajubaé Marine Extractive Reserve in the south bay of the Ilha de Santa Catarina protects people engaged in traditional harvesting of marine resources, mainly shellfish, from the sandbanks of the bay.

Transportation

International airport
Florianópolis is served by Hercílio Luz International Airport for both domestic and international flights. 

It is one of the leading airports in Brazil for charter flights, especially during the summer months and from destinations such as Santiago, Montevideo, Buenos Aires and Córdoba, besides domestic routes. The traffic has grown significantly at the airport and therefore the city plans to upgrade and expand the airport so that 2.7 million passengers can be accommodated annually.

The architectural design of the expansion was chosen by a public competition held by Infraero in partnership with the Brazilian Architects Institute (IAB).
Among the over 150 original entries, the proposal of São Paulo architect Mário Bizelli was chosen. Normally the projects for expansion and modernization of the 66 airports administered by Infraero are done by public tender based on the needs, criteria and conditions presented by the company's engineering area.

The privatization of Hercílio Luz International Airport resulted in the inauguration of the new passenger terminal in October 2019, which replaced the previous terminal from the 1970s, which was deactivated. As a result, the airport capacity grew from 1 million passengers to 3.5 million passengers a year, in the new and modern passenger terminal.

Air Force Base
Florianópolis Air Force Base - BAFL, a base of the Brazilian Air Force, is located in Florianópolis. The Air Base also hosts the Florianópolis Airspace Control Detachment and the Florianópolis Health Squadron. The Florianópolis Air Space Control Detachment is responsible for controlling the aircraft that cross, arrive or leave the capital of the state of Santa Catarina, as well as for the production and dissemination of meteorological and aeronautical information, using a wide range of equipment. detection and communications, in addition to specialized and qualified personnel. The Florianópolis Health Squadron has the mission of providing health care with excellence, carrying out preventive, assistance, forensic actions and supporting the operational activities carried out at the Florianópolis Air Force Garrison.

Highways
Florianópolis is connected to the main cities of Brazil:

From the cities of São Paulo and Rio de Janeiro: BR-116/ BR-376/ BR-101/ BR-282;
From Curitiba: BR-376/ BR-101/ BR-282;
From Porto Alegre: BR-290/ BR-101/ BR-282.

Bus terminal (connecting to other cities)
Rita Maria is the city's main bus terminal, located by the Pedro Ivo Campos Bridge, on the island, serving ten thousand people daily, which can reach up to fifteen thousand during the summer season. The bus terminal connects Florianópolis to most cities, towns and villages of Santa Catarina, and to the main cities in the South, Southeast and Central-West regions of Brazil. As an international bus terminal, residents and tourists alike use Rita Maria also to reach Argentina, Paraguay, Uruguay and Chile.

Bus terminal (within the city)
Numerous bus terminals link the neighborhoods of Florianópolis.
TICAN (Canasvieras) serves the northern beach towns on the island
TISAN (Santo Antônio de Lisboa) serves the northwestern part of the island
TICEN (Centro) is in the downtown area and has the most bus traffic. It serves all areas of the island and the mainland
TITRI (Trindade) is a connector in the northern area around downtown serving the west coast of the island
TILAG (Lagoa) is a terminal that connects users to the eastern beach areas and the district of Lagoa da Conceição
TIRIO (Rio Tavares) connects users to the southern area of the island

Cycleway
Pedala Floripa project is a university pro bicycle program developed by CICLOBRASIL group in the State University of Santa Catarina. The project aims to provide bicycle infra-structure projects and promote bicycle use for leisure and transport in the city.

Distances
Brasília: ;
Rio de Janeiro: ;
São Paulo: ;
Porto Alegre: ;
Curitiba: .
Montevideo: ;
Asunción: ;
Buenos Aires:

Neighborhoods

There are more than 40 neighborhoods in Florianópolis:

Sports 

There are two professional football teams in the city. The derby between them is known as "O Clássico da Capital" ("The Capital's Derby"), or simply "O Clássico" (The Derby).

Avaí FC – blue and white. It is also known as Leão da Ilha ("Lion of the Island"). Its stadium is the Aderbal Ramos da Silva, popularly known as Ressacada, located in the Carianos neighborhood, in the southern part of the island. Avaí plays in Campeonato Brasileiro Série A, Brazil's national first division and holds 18 State Championship titles.

Figueirense FC – black and white. Its nickname is Figueira and it is also known as O Furacão do Estreito. Its stadium is the Orlando Scarpelli, located in the Estreito neighborhood, in the continental part of the city. Figueirense plays in Campeonato Brasileiro Série C, the Brazilian national third division. The team has won Santa Catarina State Championship 18 times.

Desterro Rugby Clube has male and female rugby teams competing in the Brasil Super 10 (Men's 15s) and the Super 7s (women's 7s).

Florianópolis, since the beginning of the 20th century has a tradition in rowing. By the middle of that century the sport was growing in Brazil and the city had a big influence on it. But, with the decline of the sport in the country by the late 1980s, the investment slowed and by today is almost none. But is still served with three schools, Riachuelo Remo, Martinelli Remo and Aldo Luz Remo, with all three being placed between Hercílio Luz Bridge, Colombo Salles Bridge and Pedro Ivo Campos Bridge. Since the beginning of 2008 the sport is watching a rapid growing in the number of rowers, even with people flocking from other cities to experience Floripa's rowing.

Florianópolis is the hometown of tennis player Gustavo Kuerten. There are various opportunities to practice yoga in Florianopolis with studios that host international yoga retreats and provide teacher-training courses. Sandboarding is possible in the sand dunes near Joaquina beach. Kitesurfing and Windsurfing are possible in the Lagoa da Conceição lagoon.

The island is generally considered to be blessed with the best and most consistent Surfing waves in Brazil, and in early November of each year hosts what is South America's only Association of Surfing Professionals World Championship Tour professional surfing competition. Brazil has played host to many an ASP tour event over the past 30 years. Former contest sites include Rio de Janeiro, Barra de Tijuca and Saquarema, but the past four years have seen the tour set up shop in Florianópolis.

Falling towards the end of the tour, the past few years have seen several ASP world champions crowned in Brazil. In 2004 it was Andy Irons, and in 2005 it was Kelly Slater (who had his 2006 ASP World Title already stitched up by Brazil).

Notable people

Victor Meirelles, painter
Cruz e Sousa, symbolist poet
Gustavo Kuerten or Guga, tennis player
Pedro Barros, skateboarder
Fernando Scherer or Xuxa, swimmer
Laion Ferreira Gomes, footballer
Álvaro Sousa, composer, music teacher

Twin towns – sister cities

Florianópolis is twinned with:

 Angra do Heroísmo, Portugal
 Asunción, Paraguay
 Constitución, Chile
 Córdoba, Argentina
 Fernando de la Mora, Paraguay
 Havana, Cuba
 Luján, Argentina
 Ponta Delgada, Portugal
 Praia da Vitória, Portugal
 Presidente Franco, Paraguay
 Roanoke, United States

References

 
Populated places established in 1726
1726 establishments in Brazil
Municipalities in Santa Catarina (state)